Karl William Elsey (born 20 November 1958) is a Welsh former professional footballer. His clubs included Swansea City, Queens Park Rangers, Newport County, Cardiff City, Gillingham, Reading and Maidstone United. In total he made over 450 Football League appearances.

Career
Elsey joined Pembroke Borough from local amateur football and had a brief spell with Swansea City in the 1978–79 season before returning to Pembroke Borough. He signed for Queens Park Rangers in January 1979, but failed to establish himself.

Elsey moved to Newport County in July 1980, during the most successful period in the club's history. Elsey was part of the team that won promotion and the Welsh Cup and in the subsequent season reached the quarter-final of the 1981 European Cup Winners Cup.

He moved to Cardiff City in September 1983 in a move that saw Elsey and Nigel Vaughan join Cardiff from Newport in exchange for Tarki Micallef, John Lewis and Linden Jones. He played over 60 games for Cardiff before joining Gillingham on a free transfer in May 1985. He moved to Reading in August 1988 and, although virtually ever-present in the Reading side the following season, left to join Maidstone United in July 1989. He rejoined Gillingham in August 1991, but dropped out of league football in March 1992 when he joined Sittingbourne.

He moved to Braintree Town in December 1993, but in February 1994 moved to Ashford Town (Kent). The following month he joined Hastings Town.

In September 1994 he joined Faversham Town, but the following month left to join Margate. In April 1995 he became Margate's caretaker manager and was appointed as player-manager in early May. He was sacked in March 1996 and joined Ramsgate as a player. In April 1996 he joined Chatham Town and became their player-manager in October 1996. He left Chatham in March 1997 and joined Lordswood as a player. He remained with Lordswood until early in the following season when he dropped out of senior football.

He signed for Maidstone United in the 1998 close season and played twice for the reformed side in the Kent County League before retiring in September 1998.

Personal life
His father Billy was also a professional footballer and played for Swansea.

References

External links
 Karl Elsey profile at Margate F.C. History site

1958 births
Living people
Footballers from Swansea
Welsh footballers
Pembroke Borough A.F.C. players
Swansea City A.F.C. players
Queens Park Rangers F.C. players
Newport County A.F.C. players
Cardiff City F.C. players
Gillingham F.C. players
Reading F.C. players
Maidstone United F.C. (1897) players
Sittingbourne F.C. players
Braintree Town F.C. players
Ashford United F.C. players
Hastings United F.C. players
Faversham Town F.C. players
Margate F.C. players
Ramsgate F.C. players
Chatham Town F.C. players
Lordswood F.C. players
Maidstone United F.C. players
English Football League players
Welsh football managers
Margate F.C. managers
Association football midfielders